Catalan State-Proletarian Party (EC-PP) was a communist political party in Catalonia, Spain. It was formed in 1932 by the left-wing sector of Estat Català (EC), those who did not approve of group merging into the Republican Left of Catalonia.

Leaders of EC-PP were Jaume Compte, Ramon Fabregat, Pere Aznar and Artur Cussó. EC-PP published L'Insurgent.

EC-PP made fruitless attempts to rally other forces to join a united party, and, in the end, it launched the Proletarian Catalan Party (January 1934).

Defunct communist parties in Catalonia
1932 establishments in Spain
Political parties established in 1932
1934 disestablishments in Spain
Political parties disestablished in 1934